The Sky is a Canadian science information television series which aired on CBC Television in 1958. This half-hour series was broadcast on Sundays at 4:30 p.m. (Eastern) from 22 June to 28 September 1958.

Bob Fortune, a weather presenter for CBUT and columnist for the Vancouver Sun, hosted this series on various sky-related topics such as astrology, astronomy, aviation, rocketry and weather.

References

External links
 

CBC Television original programming
1958 Canadian television series debuts
1958 Canadian television series endings
Black-and-white Canadian television shows
Science education television series
Canadian educational television series